Headkeeper is a 1972 album by Dave Mason. Originally released on Blue Thumb Records as Blue Thumb 34 (a subsidiary of Famous Music Group), Headkeeper was reissued by MCA Records as MCA 712, then reissued on CD in 1988 as MCAD-31326).

Recording and release

In late 1971, Mason began recording Headkeeper. He envisioned a double album with one disk containing new studio recordings and the other live recordings with his new band. The live tracks had been recorded at some highly regarded dates at the Troubadour club in Los Angeles.

Mason thought that since he was Blue Thumb's most successful artist, they should renegotiate his contract. When they refused, he slipped into the studio and took the master tapes of the recordings made to date.

Producer Tommy LiPuma then assembled an album from two-track safety masters that Mason did not take which Blue Thumb released. Mason publicly denounced the release as a "bootleg".

Mason eventually signed a deal with Columbia Records who bought out his Blue Thumb contract.

Blue Thumb issued Dave Mason Is Alive in 1973 with remaining tracks from the Troubadour set.

Track listing
All tracks composed by Dave Mason; except where indicated.

Side one
 "To Be Free" - 3:19
 "In My Mind" - 3:19
 "Here We Go Again" - 1:56
 "A Heartache, A Shadow, A Lifetime" - 3:35
 "Headkeeper" - 4:39

Side two
 "Pearly Queen" (Jim Capaldi, Steve Winwood) - 3:32
 "Just a Song" - 3:01
 "World in Changes" - 4:47
 "Can't Stop Worrying, Can't Stop Loving" - 3:04
 "Feelin' Alright" - 5:40

Personnel
Dave Mason - electric and acoustic guitar, vocals
Felix Falcon aka "Flaco" - conga and percussion
"Dr." Rick Jaeger - drums
Mark Jordan - piano and keyboard instruments
Lonnie Turner - bass

Background vocals (Special thanks to):
Rita Coolidge
Spencer Davis
Kathi McDonald
Graham Nash

Production
Songs 1-5 were recorded at Sunset Sound Studios, Hollywood (Wayne Dailey, recordist)
Songs 6-10 are excerpts from live performances at the Troubadour
Recording and mixing engineer - Al Schmitt
Remote equipment by Wally Heider and crew - Miles Weiner, Terry Stark, Chris Chigaridas
Mastered by Bob MacLeod at Artisan Sound Recorders, Hollywood
Photography by Bill Matthews
Album design by Ruby Mazur's Art Department

Chart positions

Headkeeper Track

References

All information from liner notes from Headkeeper (Copyright © 1972 Blue Thumb Records) and CD release (Copyright © 1972 MCA Records, Inc. MCAD-31326).
Released in Brazil thru Young Records 304.0029 (A subsidiary of RGE Discos Ltda.)

1972 albums
Dave Mason albums
Blue Thumb Records albums
Albums produced by Dave Mason
Albums produced by Tommy LiPuma
Albums recorded at the Troubadour
Albums recorded at Sunset Sound Recorders
Unauthorized albums
Bootleg recordings